Kendall County is the name of two counties in the United States:

 Kendall County, Illinois 
 Kendall County, Texas